María Jesús Ruiz Garzón (born in Andújar, Jaén, December 25, 1982) is a Spanish model winner of Miss Spain in 2004.

She was a French language teacher in Andújar until she decided to compete in the Miss Spain contest, which she won in 2004. She later, in 2005, was a contestant in the reality show La granja de los famosos. In 2013 she started to work as actress in a soap opera in Miami. She has two children.

Filmography

Film
 Cómplices (2014) by Luis Eduardo Reyes.
 Sueños por realizar (miniseries) (2014), by Luis Rojas.

References

1982 births
Living people
Miss Spain winners
Miss Universe 2004 contestants
Spanish female models